Infinite Joy is a musical revue consisting of songs by Broadway composer William Finn. The songs are mostly material cut from Finn's earlier shows and material from works Finn was then working on. Several of the songs were included in the composer's song cycle Elegies.

Productions
The revue was initially performed on various dates in September 2000 and December 2000 through 2001 at Joe's Pub, a nightclub within The Public Theater in New York City.  Finn played the piano and sang several songs. Other performers included: Liz Callaway, Carolee Carmello, Lewis Cleale, Stephen DeRosa, Wanda Houston, Norm Lewis, Mary Testa, Farah Alvin, James Sasser, and Kristin Woodbury. The revue was performed again at Joe's Pub in November 2008, with performers Carolee Carmello, Mary Testa, Malcolm Gets, and Stephen DeRosa.

A live recording was made at the January 2001 performance and released on RCA Victor in May 2001. William Ruhlmann, reviewing the recording for Allmusic wrote: "Finn's songs often have an "inside baseball" quality to them, revolving around the gay, Jewish world of musical theater.  But they are often so witty, moving, and accomplished that they become universal despite themselves."

On March 29, 2004, another concert of Finn's songs was performed at the Merkin Concert Hall as part of The Kaufman Center's annual Broadway Close Up series, titled More Infinite Joy: The Music of William Finn.  Performers included Betty Buckley, Stephen DeRosa, Raúl Esparza, Jesse Tyler Ferguson and Janet Metz.  The songs were from Finn's The 25th Annual Putnam County Spelling Bee, Elegies, Falsettos, and A New Brain.

A third installment, Even More Infinite Joy was presented by The Kaufman Center at Merkin Concert Hall on October 31, 2005, featuring Finn, and featured songs from his "Songs of Innocence and Experience".

Songs
Mister Make Me a Song
How Marvin Eats His Breakfast
The Music Still Plays On
Republicans
I'd Rather Be Sailing
Hitchhiking Across America
That's Enough For Me
And They're Off
Anytime
Falsettos At the East Milford Community Center (Finn & DeRosa's spoken intro)
The Baseball Game
The Bitch and the Madonna (Finn welcomes Mary Testa & Carolee Carmello)
All Fall Down
When The Earth Stopped Turning
Tannis Root (Bill & Mary discuss parenting)
Set Those Sails
I Have Found
Infinite Joy
Stupid Things I Won't Do
Infinite Joy (reprise)
Bows

References

External links
Free music tracks from the CD (U.S.A. Only)

Song cycles
2001 musicals
Off-Broadway musicals
Revues
Musicals by William Finn